Hotness may refer to:
 High temperature
 Synonymous with aminna 
 A slang term for sexual attractiveness
 Pungency, the spiciness or piquancy of food, such as of hot peppers
 The Scoville scale, a numerical scale for expressing the degree of pungency
 Audio mixed with a bias toward louder sound

See also
 Hot (disambiguation)